Alexander Knappe (born 1 March 1989) is a German professional golfer.

Knappe was born in Brilon, Germany. He played one year of college golf at Texas Christian University.

Knappe turned professional in 2011 and has played on the Pro Golf Tour, Challenge Tour and Sunshine Tour. He has won three times on the Pro Golf Tour and four times on the Challenge Tour.

Amateur wins
2010 German Amateur Match Play Championship

Professional wins (7)

Sunshine Tour wins (1)

1Co-sanctioned by the Challenge Tour

Challenge Tour wins (4)

*Note: The 2016 Hainan Open was shortened to 36 holes due to rain.
1Co-sanctioned by the Sunshine Tour

Pro Golf Tour wins (3)

*Note: The 2014 Adamstal Open was shortened to 18 holes due to weather.

Team appearances
European Boys' Team Championship (representing Germany): 2006, 2007
Eisenhower Trophy (representing Germany): 2008
European Amateur Team Championship (representing Germany): 2008, 2009, 2010

See also
2016 Challenge Tour graduates
2022 Challenge Tour graduates
List of golfers with most Challenge Tour wins

References

External links

German male golfers
TCU Horned Frogs men's golfers
European Tour golfers
People from Brilon
Sportspeople from Arnsberg (region)
Sportspeople from Paderborn
1989 births
Living people